The China Post was an English-language newspaper published in Taiwan (officially the Republic of China), alongside the Taipei Times and the Taiwan News. The China Post was established by Mr. and Mrs. Y. P. Huang in 1952. 

In April 2017, The China Post announced that the print edition of the publication would end on 15 May 2017, though the website and mobile application would remain active.  

In October 2017, the original China Post website was discontinued and merged with news agency NOWnews. The China Post, however, remained a member of Asia News Network. It translated articles from Chinese into English and continued to produce bilingual content. Digging back to its roots, it had also begun to write more original articles. These included opinion articles and analysis articles on a variety of local and international topics. 

In 2021, the China Post website was discontinued.

The Sunday Post
The Sunday Post was the Sunday edition of The China Post, featuring comics and a two-page bilingual supplement for advanced ESL students. The Sunday Post was the only bilingual weekly publication in Taiwan with a recap of the week's news topics and analysis.

See also
 Asia News Network

References

External links 
 
 The Guardian: World News Guide: Taiwan

1952 establishments in Taiwan
English-language newspapers published in Taiwan
Mass media in Taipei
Online newspapers with defunct print editions
2017 disestablishments in Taiwan